Arnold Stone (11 March 1910 – 24 June 2004) was a Canadian ski jumper. He competed in the individual event at the 1932 Winter Olympics.

References

External links
 

1910 births
2004 deaths
Canadian male ski jumpers
Olympic ski jumpers of Canada
Ski jumpers at the 1932 Winter Olympics
People from Revelstoke, British Columbia
Sportspeople from British Columbia